My Wife Next Door is a British sitcom created by Brian Clemens and written by Richard Waring. It was shown on BBC1 in 1972, and ran for 13 episodes.

The programme is about a couple, George Basset (John Alderton) and Suzie Basset (Hannah Gordon). Each tries to start afresh after their divorce. They move to the country, only to find that they have moved into adjoining cottages.

The series won a British Academy Television Award for Best Situation Comedy in 1973. During a repeat run of the series, in January 1980, one episode gained 19.3 million viewers and was the second most-watched programme that week.

In the 1980s, a three-episode VHS video was released. The complete series was released onto DVD in 2018.

References

External links
 

1970s British sitcoms
1972 British television series debuts
1972 British television series endings
BBC television sitcoms
English-language television shows
BAFTA winners (television series)